The Loening C-5 was an American amphibious aircraft built by Loening in the 1930s.

Design
The C-5, a small amphibian based on the Loening XSL-2, was larger in size and featured an enclosed a cabin. The engine was cowled to reduce drag. One C-5 was built (civil registration X813W), flying in 1934.

Specifications

References

C-5
Flying boats
High-wing aircraft
Single-engined pusher aircraft
Aircraft first flown in 1934